Ardmore Studios, in Bray, County Wicklow, is Irelands's only four wall studio.

It opened in 1958 under the management of Emmet Dalton and Louis Elliman. Since then, it has evolved through many managements and owners. It has been the base for many successful Irish and international productions, including The Spy Who Came in from the Cold to Fair City, Braveheart, My Left Foot and Veronica Guerin.

After the lapse of its initial business plan in the early 1970s, the studio became the government-backed National Film Studios of Ireland, under the management of Sheamus Smith. During Smith's tenure, notable movies based there included Michael Crichton's The First Great Train Robbery, starring Sean Connery. When government funding was withdrawn in the early 1980s, a consortium led by Tara Productions (Ireland) Limited, among whose partners were producer Morgan O'Sullivan and writer Michael Feeney Callan, and MTM Hollywood acquired the studios in November 1986. O'Sullivan then spearheaded a campaign to attract major international films to Ireland – a strategy Dalton and his partner, the entrepreneur Louis Elliman, had pioneered in the 1950s – and succeeded in securing important co-production investment which revived the studios during the 1990s.
O'Sullivan's successor as managing director of the renamed Ardmore Studios was the accountant Kevin Moriarity. In 1990, the MTM shareholding was sold to Ardmore International Ltd., a company owned equally by Paul McGuinness and Ossie Kilkenny. Ardmore Studios had several successful years from 2006 to 2010 during the filming of The Tudors and Camelot. However, from 2011 to 2013 the studios suffered losses, and in 2013 Siún Ní Raghallaigh was appointed CEO. She implemented immediate cost cuts and restructured the company to enable it to compete more effectively with a lower cost base. The studios are now operating successfully.

History

Irish Film before Ardmore Studios
Ambitious Irish-based filmmaking began when producer-director Sidney Olcott made his first visit to Ireland in 1910. Prior to this time most Irish filmmaking consisted of newsreels. Olcott's first movie based in Ireland was The Lad from Old Ireland, produced by Kalem. His follow-up was Rory O'More, based on the events of the Irish Rebellions of 1641 and 1798, which earned the disapproval of both the British Home Office and the Irish Catholic Church. Olcott continued Irish filmmaking, with most of his films shot in County Kerry, specifically in the towns of Beaufort, Dunloe and Killarney. To facilitate year-round filming, Olcott planned the building of a serviced studio based in Beaufort. The outbreak of World War I derailed this plan. Irish filmmaking continued, with native-born directors initiating their own work, but through the 1920s and 1930s and 1940s, no purpose-built studio facilitated year-round filmmaking in Ireland.

Early years of Ardmore Studios
Finally, in the middle 1950s, a business consortium part-funded from the United States, started building a Hollywood-style studio south of Dublin city. Ardmore Studios first opened its doors in May 1958. Situated on a ten-acre site 12 miles south of Dublin, the studio offered the first opportunity for Irish filmmakers to shoot indoors all year round.

The first production to emerge from Ardmore Studios was an adaptation of Walter Macken's play, Home Is the Hero, starring Macken and directed by Emmy Award-winning Fielder Cooke. Renowned British director George Pollock shot the next two productions at the studio, Sally's Irish Rogue and The Big Birthday, both based on popular Abbey Theatre comedies.

In the late 1950s, managing director Emmet Dalton and entrepreneur Louis Elliman travelled to the US to promote the studios and to acquire foreign investment. The studios accordingly landed its first major foreign booking with 1959's Shake Hands with the Devil, starring Oscar winner James Cagney and Dana Wynter. A year later progress was consolidated when Robert Mitchum appeared in Tay Garnett's A Terrible Beauty. In 1961, Ardmore Studios hosted the controversial The Mark, directed by Guy Green, which was nominated for the Palme d'Or at the Cannes Film Festival and earned its star, Stuart Whitman, an Oscar nomination. Other films produced at this time include Don Chaffey's The Webster Boys and Johnny Nobody with Cyril Cusack. Hammer Films also utilised the studios as a base for their production, The Viking Queen.

The National Film Studios of Ireland and MTM Ardmore Studios era
In 1975 Sheamus Smith became managing director of the studios and film director John Boorman assumed the role of chairman. The studios were renovated and renamed as The National Film Studios of Ireland, and subsequently hosted several major movies including The Purple Taxi, starring Fred Astaire and The Great Train Robbery starring Sean Connery.

In 1981, Boorman filmed his $11.5 million epic Excalibur, where he cast a then-unknown Liam Neeson, Gabriel Byrne and Ciarán Hinds, at the studios and in the local hills of Wicklow. Also produced during this decade was John Huston's The Dead, based on the short story by James Joyce and starring Huston's daughter, Anjelica Huston.

The withdrawal of government funding effectively closed the studios in the early 1980s. For several years the lot fell into disrepair but the studio was reactivated by an initiative led by an Irish independent company, Tara Productions, in partnership with MTM Hollywood and the Irish National Enterprise Authority. Thereafter, the renamed MTM Ardmore Studios made its mark again on the global scene with the success of My Left Foot, directed by Jim Sheridan, which earned Oscars for Daniel Day-Lewis for his portrayal of the cerebral palsy sufferer Christy Brown and for Brenda Fricker, for her portrayal of Brown's mother.

From 1989 until 1994, all interior shots of Fair City were filmed at Ardmore Studios. 

In 1991, a street set, known as 'The Lot', was built at Ardmore. In 1994, Ardmore Studios and the Wicklow countryside were transformed into the Scottish Highlands for Mel Gibson's Oscar-winning Braveheart.

Ardmore Studios today
Since 2006 Ardmore Studios has been home to three television series: The Tudors, filmed between 2006 and 2010 at a cost of over €90 million, Camelot, filmed in 2010, starring Joseph Fiennes and Eva Green, and from 2014 Penny Dreadful.

In 2008, Ardmore Studios celebrated its 50th anniversary.

In 2011, Byzantium, directed by Neil Jordan, located at Ardmore.

In January 2017 the studios were used by RTE for Dancing with the Stars, Ireland's version of the popular British show Strictly Come Dancing. RTE had purchased the rights to make an Irish version of the popular dancing show, however, it became obvious to RTE that the studios at their television centre in Donnybrook in Dublin would not be large enough for the scale of the show, and so Ardmore Studios was chosen.

In April 2018 Irish firm Olcott Entertainment Limited officially announced the full acquisition of Ardmore, after purchasing the shares owned by Ardmore Studios Limited (68%) and Enterprise Ireland (32%).

Facilities based at Ardmore
During its MTM incarnation in the 1980s, Ardmore extended its facilities and built new sound stages. Today it offers 5 stages, including a water tank facility. In the early 1980s a handful of service provider companies were located on the lot. Under O'Sullivan's management, the range of Ardmore-based service and facility companies increased to include other specialised related businesses. These include:

 Digital Sound Facilities
 Lighting Facilities
 Art Departments
 Workshops and prop stores
 Production offices
 Make-up, hair and wardrobe department.

Companies located at Ardmore studios include:
 CineElectric
 Panavision
 World 2000 Entertainment

Productions made at, or based in, the studios

Music albums recorded at Ardmore
 The Corrs Unplugged (1999)
 VH1 Presents: The Corrs, Live in Dublin (2002)

See also
 Cinema of Ireland

References

External links
 Ardmore Studios official website
 Dáil Éireann Parliamentary Debate, December 1993 Irish Film Board (Amendment) Bill, 1993

Irish film studios
Film production companies of Ireland